The mountain treeshrew (Tupaia montana) is a treeshrew species within the Tupaiidae. It is endemic to Borneo and inhabits montane forests in Sarawak and Sabah, Malaysia, and Kalimantan, Indonesia.

The first specimen was described by Oldfield Thomas and was part of a zoological collection from northern Borneo obtained by the British Museum of Natural History.

Characteristics
The mountain treeshrew is dark grizzled rufous above with an indistinct black line along the back. Its tail is rather short and grizzled rufous above, but below more olivaceous yellow with a black tip. The lateral tail hairs are ringed. The head and body length measures 15–33 cm and the tail length measures 13–19 cm.

Distribution and habitat
Mountain treeshrews have mostly been recorded in montane outcrops above .

Ecology and behaviour
In their natural habitat, mountain treeshrews were observed being active during the day. They forage on the ground among fallen logs and branches where they feed mostly on arthropods. They also consume large quantities of wild fruits and berries, eating them in short bursts. It is assumed that they extract sugar laden juices and in this way supplement any dietary deficiencies of an arthropod diet.

Results of a behavioral study of a group of 12 wild-caught captive mountain treeshrews indicate that they are more social than groups of other treeshrew species. Two males tended to dominate the group. Females had an estrous cycle lasting nine to 12 days. Gestation lasted 49 to 51 days. They did not display a distinct reproductive season. Litters comprised one to two young.

Mountain treeshrews have a mutualistic relationship with several pitcher plants species such as Nepenthes lowii, Nepenthes macrophylla, and Nepenthes rajah. They defecate into the plants' pitchers while visiting them to feed on sweet, fruity secretions from glands on the pitcher lids.

References

Treeshrews
Mammals of Borneo
Mammals of Brunei
Mammals of Indonesia
Mammals of Malaysia
Endemic fauna of Borneo
Fauna of the Borneo montane rain forests
Mammals described in 1892
Taxa named by Oldfield Thomas
Taxonomy articles created by Polbot